These are the Billboard magazine R&B albums that have reached number one in 1986.

Chart history

See also
1986 in music
R&B number-one hits of 1986 (USA)

1986